Witless Bay is a town on the Avalon Peninsula in the Canadian province of Newfoundland and Labrador. Located on the Irish Loop, 35 km south of the provincial capital, St. John's, Witless Bay is a small, scenic, traditional  Newfoundland outport community. The town had a population of 1640 in the Canada 2021 Census. It is connected to the Witless Bay Ecological Reserve.

Witless Bay is the setting for Howard Norman's novel, The Bird Artist.

Etymology
One of the original European inhabitants of the area was Captain Whittle, who had brought his family from Dorset, England, to Newfoundland. The area was named after them: Whittle's Bay. When Captain Whittle died, his widow and her children returned to England. Whittle's Bay (which was from then on "Whittles-less) eventually became Witless Bay.

History
1675, the population of Witless Bay is 34.

1700s, Irish fishing servants begin arriving in the area and quickly start to outnumber the English.

1755, as Roman Catholicism is still outlawed in Newfoundland, priests disguised as fishermen, minister to the spiritual needs of the community.

1836, the first official census of Newfoundland puts the population at 542, of which 540 were Roman Catholic.

1845, Roman Catholic Church opens.

1860, the Presentation Sisters open a convent and a school for girls.

1871, population reaches 928.

1960s, people are re-settled from Gallows Cove at the southern headland of Witless Bay to the community of Witless Bay.

1986, Witless Bay is incorporated,

1986 - The first town Manager of the Town of Witless Bay is Joan Marie Yard (1943-1999)

2016, population reaches 1619, population grows by 38.7% from 2011, making it the fastest growing town in the province.

Demographics 

Economy

Witless Bay is a fishing community, first established because of its closeness to the rich fishing grounds on the Grand Banks. Tourism is an important part of the community as well, since the community is home to the Witless Bay Ecological Reserve, which contains North America's largest Atlantic Puffin colony and the world's second-largest colony of Leach's Storm-petrels. The presence of these bird colonies has given birth to the Witless Bay Puffin and Petrel Patrol, a volunteer organization aiming to save stranded chick and return them safely to the ocean.  Bed-and-breakfast establishments, coffee shops, a whale and puffin tour operator, several craftspeople, and the Witless Bay and Area Puffin and Petrel Patrol attract visitors from all over the world.

St. Bernard's Elementary School, part of the Eastern School District, is located in Witless Bay. The town is also home to one of the three surviving crab processing plants of the Irish Loop.

Government
The Witless Bay Town Council is made up of a Mayor, Deputy Mayor, and five Councillors. The current Mayor of the town is Trevor Croft.  The Deputy Mayor is Lorna Yard.   Councillors are Nancy Burke, Ralph Carey, Gerard Dunne, Jacob Hayden and Alex Troake.

Joan Marie Yard was the first town manager of the town of Witless Bay (from incorporation in 1986 until her death at the age of 55 in 1999). She was very active in bringing many new initiatives to the town including the Girl Guides of Canada, The Witless Bay Volunteer Fire Department, and was instrumental in the creation of the Witless Bay Santa Claus Parade.  As well she was the organist for the local church and an advocate of preserving natural assets.

The current town manager is Geraldine Jeddore Caul who has roots in the aboriginal community in Newfoundland and Labrador and is the daughter of John Nick Jeddore, author of the book - Moccasin Tracks: A Memoir of Mi'kmaw Life in Newfoundland.

In Fall 2017, the entire town council was elected unopposed. For legal reasons, one of its first major decisions was a unanimous vote in favour of abolishing the rules on transparency, ethics, conflict of interests, and land use set in place by the previous town council and resubmit the manual to Municipal Affairs for review and acceptance. After public backlash against the town council's decisions on social media, it unanimously voted in March 2018 to use public funds to hire a criminal lawyer to probe their online critics.

See also
 List of cities and towns in Newfoundland and Labrador

References

External links

Town of Witless Bay official Website
Video about the restoration of Witless Bay's Presentation Convent
CPAWS Web Page about the Witless Bay Puffin & Petrel Patrol
Witless Bay - Encyclopedia of Newfoundland and Labrador, vol.5, p. 603-604.

Towns in Newfoundland and Labrador